Prilesje is a small settlement in the hills above Blagovica in the Municipality of Lukovica in the eastern part of the Upper Carniola region of Slovenia.

References

External links
Prilesje on Geopedia

Populated places in the Municipality of Lukovica